Work It is an American television sitcom that aired on ABC from January 3 to January 10, 2012. Set in St. Louis, the series is about two men who must dress as women in order to keep a job in a bad economy.

The series had received overwhelmingly negative reviews. The series premiere was watched by an American audience of 6.16 million. Ratings dropped to 4.9 million viewers in the second episode, and the series was cancelled by ABC on January 13, 2012, after two episodes aired, following another attempt at a "man-cession" comedy called Man Up!, which failed earlier in the season.

Premise
Work It centered on men laid off from a fictional St. Louis GM plant after the Pontiac line was phased out, who believe that the current economic recession and job shortage has affected men more than women. One of the men, Lee Standish, inquires about a job opening at Coreco Pharmaceuticals, where he finds that the company employs female sales reps almost exclusively. He then dresses as a woman, applies for the job, and is hired. Character development, starting in the first episode, involves the men learning how to be more "sensitive".

Lee and Angel's coworkers at Coreco are Kristin, a clingy divorced mother who instantly took a shine to Lee; Kelly, who is far more apt to cavort with men and indulge in drink than to do her job; Grace, the condescending regional sales leader; and Vanessa, the boss, whom the workers wrongly assume is a lesbian, and whom Angel immediately becomes enamored with.  In addition to the women at work, the guys have to hide their secret identities from Lee's wife Connie, a nurse who works in a doctor's office; his teenaged daughter Kat; and Connie's brother Brian, who was laid off along with Lee and Angel and now resides in his ex-wife's home.

Cast
 Ben Koldyke as Lee Standish
 Amaury Nolasco as Angel Ortiz
 Beth Lacke as Connie Standish
 John Caparulo as Brian
 Rebecca Mader as Grace Hudson
 Rochelle Aytes as Vanessa Warner
 Kate Reinders as Kelly
 Kirstin Eggers as Kristin
 Hannah Sullivan as Kat Standish
In the unaired pilot, Kacie Lynch played Kat before was replaced by Hannah Sullivan.

Episodes

Reception

Critical reception
Reception for the series was very negative; it was largely panned by critics and viewers alike. Metacritic gave it a score of 19/100 (overwhelming dislike) based on 22 reviews. Matt Fowler of IGN gave the pilot episode a score of "0", the first television review since 1998 from the company to get a score of "0" (according to Fowler). Robert Bianco of USA Today also did not give it an enthusiastic review, calling it "witless, tasteless, poorly acted, abominably written, clumsily directed, hideously lit and badly costumed". He gave it a grade of one star out of four. The Pittsburgh Post-Gazette reviewer compared the show unfavorably to Bosom Buddies, which had a similar premise. Emily VanDerWerff of The A.V. Club gave the pilot an F grade, stating, "Let's just get this out of the way first: Work It is awful. The grade should indicate that. But it's fascinatingly awful, in that way where you wonder how the hell something like this got on TV in the year 2012." Alan Pergament, formerly of The Buffalo News, expressed surprise that the show even made it to air, stating "I do recall I couldn't get those 22 minutes of my life back. It was so unfunny and forced that I suspected it would never air."

Controversy
LGBT advocacy groups have expressed concerns about Work It, saying that it trivializes the obstacles faced by transgender people in the workplace. Groups that have expressed concern include Human Rights Campaign, the Los Angeles Gay and Lesbian Center's Transgender Economic Empowerment Program and the Transgender Law Center. The Gay and Lesbian Alliance Against Defamation released a statement that, while acknowledging that the series pilot "does not explicitly address transgender people", still concluded that "[d]uring a period in which the transgender community now routinely finds itself in the cultural crosshairs, the timing couldn’t be worse for a show based on the notion that men dressed as women is inherently funny." Frequently cited is the print advertisement for the series, which features two men dressed as women standing at men's room urinals.

The pilot was criticized and protests took place at the network offices for a line of dialogue delivered by Amaury Nolasco's character Angel, who claimed that as a Puerto Rican he would "be great at selling drugs".

Ratings
The pilot episode scored a 2.0 adults 18-49 rating and 6.160 million viewers. The second and last episode saw a 25% drop in the adults 18-49 demo, scoring only a 1.5.

See also

Bosom Buddies
Transphobia
List of television shows considered the worst

References

External links

Trailer on ABC's official YouTune channel

2010s American sitcoms
2010s American workplace comedy television series
2012 American television series debuts
2012 American television series endings
American Broadcasting Company original programming
Cross-dressing in television
English-language television shows
Television series by Warner Bros. Television Studios
Television shows set in St. Louis
LGBT-related controversies in television